Mula Essa Goth  is one of the neighbourhoods of Gadap Town in Karachi, Sindh, Pakistan.

There are several ethnic groups in Mula Essa Goth including Muhajirs, Christians, Sindhis, Kashmiris, Seraikis, Pakhtuns, Balochis, Memons, Bohras and Ismailis.

Wide and newly built roads with all facilities i.e. water, gas, electricity, telephone, cable TV and cable net.

See also 
 Gadap Town
 Darsano Chana
 Gabol Town
 Gadap
 Gujro
 Gulshan-e-Maymar
 Gulshan-e-Sheraz
 Khuda Ki Basti
 Manghopir Hills
 Manghopir
 Maymarabad
 Murad Memon Goth
 Songal
 Surjani Town
 Yousuf Goth
 Sohrab Goth

References

Neighbourhoods of Karachi
Gadap Town